Taras Shevchenko is a 1951 Soviet biopic about the Ukrainian writer Taras Shevchenko, written and directed by Igor Savchenko. The New York Times praised the acting of Sergei Bondarchuk.

Synopsis
Summer 1841. Lermontov is killed. The news of this arrives to a modest attic of the Saint Petersburg Academy of Arts, where lives and works the young artist and poet Taras Shevchenko. Growing up in a Ukrainian peasant family, knowing all hardships of serf life, Shevchenko in the years of study clearly identifies the meaning of true art, which is to serve the interests of the people.

After graduating from the Academy, Shevchenko goes to Ukraine. The poems of Taras are imbued with love for the common people. Landowner-nationalists, liberal leaders of the Cyril and Methodius Brotherhood, try to "tame" the famous poet, but Shevchenko forever has made his choice; he is on the side of the people, their defender and crooner. The fiery freedom-loving creativity of Taras Shevchenko is known throughout Russia. 

Nicholas I exiles the poet to the distant Caspian fort where he is to serve as an ordinary soldier and is banned from writing or drawing. In the poet's difficult days he has the support of Ukrainian soldier Skobelev, Polish revolutionary Serakovsky, captain Kosarev and the major of the fortress, Uskov. 

For the sake of his release Chernyshevsky and Dobrolyubov are hard at work. And so, the sick and aged Shevchenko is finally free. Together with Chernyshevsky and Dobrolyubov, he dreams of a bright future of the motherland, when the Russian and Ukrainian peoples throw off the chains of slavery.

Awards
Sergei Bondarchuk won the Stalin Prize and the Best Actor Award at the Karlovy Vary International Film Festival for his acting.

Cast
 Sergei Bondarchuk as Taras Shevchenko
Vladimir Chestnokov as Nikolay Chernyshevsky
Nikolai Timofeyev as Nikolay Dobrolyubov
Hnat Yura as Mikhail Shchepkin
 Ivan Pereverzev as Zygmunt Sierakowski
Yevgeny Samoylov as Nikolay Speshnev
Lavrenty Masokha as Mykola Kostomarov
 Pavel Shpringfeld as Panteleimon Kulish
Aleksey Konsovsky as Vladimir Kurochkin
Grigory Shpigel as Karl Bryullov
 Mikhail Nazvanov as Nicholas I of Russia
 Mark Bernes as captain Kosarev
Dmitri Milyutenko as major Uskov
Marianna Strizhenova as Agafia Uskova
Mikhail Kuznetsov as soldier Skobelev
Natalia Uzhviy as Yarina Shevchenko
Mikhail Troyanovsky as chief of gendarmes
 Alexander Khvylya as Lord Barabash
 Garen Zhukovskaya as Lady Barabash
Mikhail Vysotsky as Yevdokim Appolonovich Lukashevich
Gennady Yudin as agitator
Leonid Kmit as staff captain Obryadin
Aleksandr Baranov as Potapov
Konstantin Sorokin as ginger corporal
Vladimir Soshalsky as ensign Nikolai Mombelli, Shevchenko's friend
Latif Fayziyev as Kyrgyz
Stanislav Chekan as cabby
Stepan Shkurat as serf bandura player
Dmitry Kapka as priest
 Vyacheslav Tikhonov as representative of the Petersburg youth
Ivan Savkin as representative of the Petersburg youth
Marina Ladynina as Countess Pototskaya
Nikolai Grinko as serf-rebel
Vladimir Troshin as serf-rebel
Anatoly Chemodurov as student
Oleg Golubitsky as student
Vsevolod Sanayev as episode

References

External links

1950s biographical drama films
Soviet biographical drama films
Ukrainian-language films
Taras Shevchenko
Films directed by Igor Savchenko
Films directed by Aleksandr Alov
Films directed by Vladimir Naumov
Films set in 1841
Films set in the Russian Empire
Films set in Saint Petersburg
Ukrainian biographical films
1951 drama films
Cultural depictions of Nicholas I of Russia
Biographical films about writers
Ukrainian drama films
Soviet-era Ukrainian films